Kazaky is a Ukrainian synthpop dance boyband, made up of Kyryll Fedorenko, Artur Gaspar and Artemiy Lazarev. Assembled in Kyiv in 2010 by former original member Zhezhel, a skilled choreographer, the group has released two albums and several singles so far. In 2016 the group announced they were disbanding  saying "It's time to create new interesting things" with the group members pursuing solo careers. In 2019, the group reformed with two new members Vlad Koval and Evgeny Goncharenko.

History

2010–11: Formation and Single releases 
The band is originally made up of Kyryll Fedorenko, Artur Gaspar, Stas Pavlov and Oleg Zhezhel. The group's first single, "In the Middle", was released at the end of 2010, earning them the "Breakthrough of the Year" award at the 2010 Myway Dance Awards. The video features the four group members dancing in boy clothes at first, and then transitioning into a more androgynous look with their signature stiletto heels. It quickly went viral on YouTube. It was then followed by the video for their second single, "Love," shot in black & white, which furthered their online popularity. In June 2011, the group performed at the DSquared² Men Spring/Summer 2012 runway show. On 16 July 2011, they made their American debut at Club 57 in New York City, and performed their third single "I'm Just a Dancer" for the first time. In August 2011, original member Pavlov left the group and was replaced by Italian singer Francesco Borgato.

2012–13: Departure of Zhezhel, The Hills Chronicles and I Like It 
With this new line-up, they released two more singles, called "Dance and Change" and "Last night" until they released the group's debut album The Hills Chronicles on October 22, 2012. In 2012, Kazaky are featured as cameo as background dancers in the Madonna music video "Girl Gone Wild". On February 26, 2013, Borgato announced his departure from the group to pursue a solo career. Former original member Stas Pavlov rejoined the group immediately after Borgato's departure, and he is featured in the group's new track and video, "Crazy Law", released on March 4, 2013. It will serve as the group's first single of their second studio album, titled I Like It, which is set to be released in two parts. The first part has been released on June 9, 2013, while the second part has been released on December 12, 2013. The follow up singles were "Touch Me" and the promotional single "Doesn't Matter", both released in 2013. On December 12, 2013, founder Zhezhel announced on their official Facebook page that he won't perform with Kazaky anymore, leaving them as a trio, thus he added that he will continue to produce the group's music and choreographies. He stated he won't leave Kazaky.

2014–15: Second departure of Pavlov and Singles 
In 2014, original member Pavlov left the band for a second time and was soon to be replaced by new member Artemiy Lazarev. In 2014, the follow up singles "The Sun", "Magic Pie" and "Pulse", which music video has been shot by director Radislav Lukin, and the promotional single "Horizon" have been released. On September 29, 2014, Kazaky were featured in the song "Strange Moves" by The Hardkiss, to be released as a single with a music video. Zhezhel makes a special cameo appearance in "Strange Moves" alongside his former bandmates. In 2015, the final single from I Like It, titled "What You Gonna Do", has been released. In the same year, the group makes a dance sequence cameo in the video for Loreen's music video "Paper Light (Higher)". Their single "Milk-Choc" has been released in 2015 as the lead single from their upcoming third studio album.

2016: Disbanding and 2019: Return 

In June 2016 the band announced they would be disbanding due to each member wanting to take different creative paths individually. Kazaky has stated that the band cannot exclude the idea of them not coming back together again to create something for the fans. The group has since been posting updates on their "Kazaky Official" Facebook page about their individual activities such as solo concerts and collaborations with other artists. But on June 24, 2019, finally after more than three years, Kazaky come back together posting a new video on YouTube of the song "Push" where appear two new member Vlad Koval and Evgeny Goncharenko. The band dedicated "Push" to the "entire LGBTQ community" that had supported them over the past nine years. The song was released to mark the 2019 Kyiv Pride parade. Other singles were published in the same year like "Inside My Body", "Hands up" and "We Should Be Like No One Else".

Other endeavours

Fashion
Because of their daring and unusual fashion sense, the band has been featured on a number of high-profile publications, such as Attitude, Billboard, GQ, The Los Angeles Times, New York Post and The New York Times. After Anna Osmekhina created their fashion for the "Love" music video, Kazaky hired her to design their outfits and style their videos. However, the group has also received and worn fashion from DSquared² and Thierry Mugler. Their high-heeled shoes are all , and they are designed to allow them to dance comfortably for their stage performances. The group has a penchant for elaborate, decadent and very structural costumes, or alternatively very skimpy outfits meant to enhance the physicality of their performances.

Artistry

Music
Kazaky's sound draws on house, synthpop, electronica and dance. Their tracks feature monotone, loopy, manipulated vocals and dance-driven, layered beats with electronic bleeps and prominent bass lines.

Style
"Kazaky" is Ukrainian for "Cossacks". The Cossacks had a very prominent role in the shaping of Ukraine's national history and culture. However, the band claims that their name has nothing to do with the Cossacks, but that it is a derivative form of the Japanese word Kazaki, which they claim is a popular word in Japan.

All four members are trained dancers, and the group is famous for their elaborate, acrobatic and spectacular choreography routines, which feature perfectly synchronized and complex dancing moves executed on high heels. Artur Gaspar is especially known for his signature leg lift, which he often performs live and in videos. The group confronts gender norms by fusing masculine and feminine attributes together, most notably by regularly wearing stiletto heels in videos and live performances.

Members

Oleg won't perform with Kazaky anymore, but he will continue to produce the group's music and choreographies.

Discography

Studio albums

Singles

Singles (As featured artist)

Promotional Singles

Filmography

Music videos

Tours 

The Pulse Tour (2014-2015)

See also

 List of synthpop artists
 Ukrainian culture

References

External links 
 kazaky.com, the group's official website
 

 
Discographies of Ukrainian artists
2010 establishments in Ukraine
House music groups
Musical groups established in 2010
Ukrainian synthpop groups
Ukrainian pop music groups
Musical groups disestablished in 2016
English-language singers from Ukraine
Musical groups reestablished in 2019